The 2014 Pro Kabaddi League was the first season of Pro Kabaddi League. The duration of the season was from 26 July 2014 to 31 August 2014. There was double round robin matches along with two semi finals, third place and final games. 56 games were to be played in first round and 4 in play off stage making total of 60 games. 8 teams took part in first edition. First game was played on July 26 between U Mumba and Jaipur Pink Panthers and the final was played on August 31 at Sardar Vallabhbhai Patel Indoor Stadium, Mumbai. Jaipur Pink Panthers beat U Mumba by 35–24 to win the inaugural Pro Kabaddi League.

Player auction
The first signing and auction of players for the 8 teams was held on 20 May 2014 in Mumbai. India's national kabaddi captain Rakesh Kumar was the priciest among the players bought for 12.80 lakh by Patna franchise. Sports Authority of India's Deepak Niwas Hooda was bought by Vizag franchise for 12.90 lakh. Mostafa Noudehi was the highest paid overseas player bought for 6.6 lakh by Pune franchise.

Franchises

Stadium and locations

Personnel

Points Table

Match Schedule

Leg 1: Sardar Vallabhbhai Patel Indoor Stadium, Mumbai

Leg 2: Netaji Indoor Stadium, Kolkata

Leg 3: Thyagaraj Sports Complex, New Delhi

Leg 4: Patliputra Sports Complex, Patna

Leg 5: Shree Shiv Chhatrapati Sports Complex, Pune

Leg 6: Rajiv Gandhi Indoor Stadium, Vizag

Leg 7:Sawai Mansingh Stadium, Jaipur

Leg 8:Sree Kanteerava Stadium, Bengaluru

Playoff Stage
All matches were played in Mumbai

Semi-Final 1

Semi-Final 2

3/4 Place

FINAL

Statistics

Top 5 Raiders

Top 5 Defenders

References

Pro Kabaddi League seasons
2014 in Indian sport